The 1995 Pittsburgh Pirates season was their 114th season; the 109th in the National League. This was their 26th season at Three Rivers Stadium. The Pirates finished fifth and last in the National League Central with a record of 58–86.

Offseason
October 13, 1994: Jacob Brumfield was traded by the Cincinnati Reds to the Pittsburgh Pirates for Danny Clyburn.
November 9, 1994: Dan Plesac was signed as a free agent with the Pittsburgh Pirates.
November 10, 1994: Dale Sveum was signed as a free agent with the Pittsburgh Pirates.
December 6, 1994: Randy St. Claire was signed as a free agent with the Pittsburgh Pirates.
December 8, 1994: Todd Frohwirth was signed as a free agent with the Pittsburgh Pirates.
December 12, 1994: Mackey Sasser was signed as a free agent with the Pittsburgh Pirates.
January 26, 1995: Sam Horn was signed as a free agent with the Pittsburgh Pirates.

Regular season

Season standings

Game log

|- bgcolor="ffbbbb"
| 1 || April 26 || Expos || 2–6 || Fassero || Lieber (0–1) || — || 34,841 || 0–1
|- bgcolor="ffbbbb"
| 2 || April 27 || Expos || 1–2 || Martinez || Wagner (0–1) || Rojas || 7,047 || 0–2
|- bgcolor="ffbbbb"
| 3 || April 28 || @ Phillies || 2–5 || Quantrill || Neagle (0–1) || Slocumb || 47,088 || 0–3
|- bgcolor="ccffcc"
| 4 || April 29 || @ Phillies || 3–2 || Loaiza (1–0) || Green || Gott (1) || 27,530 || 1–3
|-

|- bgcolor="ffbbbb"
| 5 || May 1 || @ Cardinals || 0–4 || Hill || Wagner (0–2) || — || 21,699 || 1–4
|- bgcolor="ccffcc"
| 6 || May 2 || @ Cardinals || 7–6 || Dyer (1–0) || Jackson || Gott (2) || 18,636 || 2–4
|- bgcolor="ffbbbb"
| 7 || May 3 || @ Cardinals || 6–8 || Watson || Loaiza (1–1) || Henke || 20,472 || 2–5
|- bgcolor="ffbbbb"
| 8 || May 5 || Cubs || 4–8 || Foster || Lieber (0–2) || — || 17,506 || 2–6
|- bgcolor="ffbbbb"
| 9 || May 6 || Cubs || 5–13 || Navarro || Wagner (0–3) || — || 14,318 || 2–7
|- bgcolor="ccffcc"
| 10 || May 7 || Cubs || 4–3 || Maddux (1–0) || Banks || Miceli (1) || 22,323 || 3–7
|- bgcolor="ffbbbb"
| 11 || May 8 || Astros || 3–6 || Jones || Gott (0–1) || Hudek || 7,300 || 3–8
|- bgcolor="ffbbbb"
| 12 || May 9 || Astros || 6–13 || Reynolds || Lieber (0–3) || — || 7,733 || 3–9
|- bgcolor="ffbbbb"
| 13 || May 11 || Astros || 4–12 || Swindell || Wagner (0–4) || — || 7,709 || 3–10
|- bgcolor="ccffcc"
| 14 || May 12 || @ Giants || 9–4 || Neagle (1–1) || Portugal || — || 9,867 || 4–10
|- bgcolor="ffbbbb"
| 15 || May 13 || @ Giants || 4–6 || Rosselli || Wilson (0–1) || Beck || 12,163 || 4–11
|- bgcolor="ffbbbb"
| 16 || May 14 || @ Giants || 1–2 (10) || Beck || Miceli (0–1) || — || 19,778 || 4–12
|- bgcolor="ffbbbb"
| 17 || May 15 || @ Dodgers || 0–4 || Martinez || Wagner (0–5) || — || 35,691 || 4–13
|- bgcolor="ccffcc"
| 18 || May 16 || @ Dodgers || 2–0 || Neagle (2–1) || Valdez || Miceli (2) || 26,928 || 5–13
|- bgcolor="ccffcc"
| 19 || May 17 || @ Dodgers || 3–2 || Plesac (1–0) || Williams || Miceli (3) || 28,164 || 6–13
|- bgcolor="ccffcc"
| 20 || May 18 || @ Dodgers || 7–6 || Christiansen (1–0) || Williams || Gott (3) || 24,495 || 7–13
|- bgcolor="ccffcc"
| 21 || May 19 || @ Padres || 8–6 || Lieber (1–3) || Hamilton || Miceli (4) || 11,133 || 8–13
|- bgcolor="ffbbbb"
| 22 || May 20 || @ Padres || 6–9 || Valenzuela || Gott (0–2) || — || 10,433 || 8–14
|- bgcolor="ccffcc"
| 23 || May 21 || @ Padres || 6–1 || Neagle (3–1) || Benes || — || 12,973 || 9–14
|- bgcolor="ffbbbb"
| 24 || May 23 || Marlins || 1–6 || Hammond || Loaiza (1–2) || — || 11,273 || 9–15
|- bgcolor="ccffcc"
| 25 || May 25 || Marlins || 3–1 || Plesac (2–0) || Witt || Miceli (5) || 6,763 || 10–15
|- bgcolor="ccffcc"
| 26 || May 26 || Rockies || 4–2 || Wagner (1–5) || Acevedo || Miceli (6) || 11,183 || 11–15
|- bgcolor="ccffcc"
| 27 || May 27 || Rockies || 9–4 || Neagle (4–1) || Swift || — || 16,082 || 12–15
|- bgcolor="ffbbbb"
| 28 || May 28 || Rockies || 3–6 || Freeman || White (0–1) || Ruffin || 15,016 || 12–16
|- bgcolor="ffbbbb"
| 29 || May 30 || Reds || 2–4 || Schourek || Lieber (1–4) || Brantley || 7,666 || 12–17
|- bgcolor="ffbbbb"
| 30 || May 31 || Reds || 1–11 || Smiley || Wagner (1–6) || — || 7,855 || 12–18
|-

|- bgcolor="ccffcc"
| 31 || June 1 || Reds || 5–3 || Neagle (5–1) || Rijo || Miceli (7) || 8,403 || 13–18
|- bgcolor="ffbbbb"
| 32 || June 2 || @ Rockies || 4–7 || Holmes || McCurry (0–1) || — || 45,828 || 13–19
|- bgcolor="ffbbbb"
| 33 || June 3 || @ Rockies || 6–7 || Ritz || Lieber (1–5) || Holmes || 48,144 || 13–20
|- bgcolor="ffbbbb"
| 34 || June 4 || @ Rockies || 1–4 || Grahe || Wagner (1–7) || Leskanic || 48,061 || 13–21
|- bgcolor="ffbbbb"
| 35 || June 5 || @ Reds || 2–3 || Smiley || Neagle (5–2) || Brantley || 23,233 || 13–22
|- bgcolor="ffbbbb"
| 36 || June 6 || @ Reds || 1–2 (10) || McElroy || Miceli (0–2) || — || 21,399 || 13–23
|- bgcolor="ccffcc"
| 37 || June 7 || @ Reds || 7–3 || Lieber (2–5) || Jarvis || Plesac (1) || 22,610 || 14–23
|- bgcolor="ffbbbb"
| 38 || June 8 || @ Marlins || 3–7 || Mathews || Wagner (1–8) || — || 17,871 || 14–24
|- bgcolor="ffbbbb"
| 39 || June 9 || @ Marlins || 4–5 || Hammond || Neagle (5–3) || Perez || 20,014 || 14–25
|- bgcolor="ccffcc"
| 40 || June 10 || @ Marlins || 6–2 || Loaiza (2–2) || Witt || — || 28,881 || 15–25
|- bgcolor="ccffcc"
| 41 || June 11 || @ Marlins || 4–3 || Miceli (1–2) || Nen || — || 23,126 || 16–25
|- bgcolor="ffbbbb"
| 42 || June 13 || Dodgers || 3–5 || Valdez || Lieber (2–6) || Worrell || 17,284 || 16–26
|- bgcolor="ffbbbb"
| 43 || June 14 || Dodgers || 5–8 || Nomo || Wagner (1–9) || Worrell || 10,313 || 16–27
|- bgcolor="ccffcc"
| 44 || June 15 || Dodgers || 11–7 || Neagle (6–3) || Astacio || — || 9,869 || 17–27
|- bgcolor="ffbbbb"
| 45 || June 16 || Padres || 4–12 || Benes || Loaiza (2–3) || — || 15,737 || 17–28
|- bgcolor="ffbbbb"
| 46 || June 17 || Padres || 8–11 || Florie || Lieber (2–7) || Hoffman || 15,251 || 17–29
|- bgcolor="ffbbbb"
| 47 || June 18 || Padres || 0–2 || Ashby || Wagner (1–10) || — || 18,902 || 17–30
|- bgcolor="ccffcc"
| 48 || June 19 || Giants || 8–2 || Neagle (7–3) || Mintz || — || 9,811 || 18–30
|- bgcolor="ccffcc"
| 49 || June 20 || Giants || 5–3 || Loaiza (3–3) || Leiter || Miceli (8) || 12,620 || 19–30
|- bgcolor="ffbbbb"
| 50 || June 21 || Giants || 5–6 || Burba || McCurry (0–2) || Beck || 9,180 || 19–31
|- bgcolor="ccffcc"
| 51 || June 23 || @ Expos || 2–0 || Neagle (8–3) || Martinez || — || 27,367 || 20–31
|- bgcolor="ffbbbb"
| 52 || June 24 || @ Expos || 0–5 || Perez || Ericks (0–1) || — || 25,187 || 20–32
|- bgcolor="ccffcc"
| 53 || June 25 || @ Expos || 1–0 || Loaiza (4–3) || Fassero || Miceli (9) || 27,850 || 21–32
|- bgcolor="ccffcc"
| 54 || June 26 || @ Cubs || 8–6 || Parris (1–0) || Trachsel || Miceli (10) || 24,592 || 22–32
|- bgcolor="ccffcc"
| 55 || June 27 || @ Cubs || 6–5 || Neagle (9–3) || Bullinger || Plesac (2) || 22,163 || 23–32
|- bgcolor="ffbbbb"
| 56 || June 28 || @ Cubs || 3–10 || Hickerson || Dyer (1–1) || — || 20,157 || 23–33
|- bgcolor="ccffcc"
| 57 || June 30 || @ Astros || 12–9 || Loaiza (5–3) || Kile || — || 28,167 || 24–33
|-

|- bgcolor="ffbbbb"
| 58 || July 1 || @ Astros || 0–11 || Reynolds || Parris (1–1) || — || 18,992 || 24–34
|- bgcolor="ffbbbb"
| 59 || July 2 || @ Astros || 3–5 || Swindell || Neagle (9–4) || Jones || 20,310 || 24–35
|- bgcolor="ccffcc"
| 60 || July 4 || Phillies || 7–0 || Ericks (1–1) || Quantrill || — || 23,334 || 25–35
|- bgcolor="ccffcc"
| 61 || July 5 || Phillies || 7–4 || Plesac (3–0) || Charlton || — || 9,245 || 26–35
|- bgcolor="ffbbbb"
| 62 || July 6 || Phillies || 5–10 || West || Parris (1–2) || — || 10,039 || 26–36
|- bgcolor="ffbbbb"
| 63 || July 7 || Mets || 8–9 || Dipoto || Miceli (1–3) || Franco || 12,468 || 26–37
|- bgcolor="ccffcc"
| 64 || July 8 || Mets || 3–2 || Ericks (2–1) || Pulsipher || — || 14,722 || 27–37
|- bgcolor="ccffcc"
| 65 || July 9 || Mets || 6–3 || Loaiza (6–3) || Saberhagen || — || 16,015 || 28–37
|- bgcolor="ccffcc"
| 66 || July 12 || Braves || 2–1 || Parris (2–2) || Smoltz || Miceli (11) || 9,123 || 29–37
|- bgcolor="ccffcc"
| 67 || July 13 || Cardinals || 7–6 || Dyer (2–1) || Parrett || Miceli (12) || 9,065 || 30–37
|- bgcolor="ffbbbb"
| 68 || July 14 || Cardinals || 4–6 || Hill || Loaiza (6–4) || Henke || 12,535 || 30–38
|- bgcolor="ccffcc"
| 69 || July 15 || Cardinals || 9–2 || Neagle (10–4) || Watson || — || 12,451 || 31–38
|- bgcolor="ccffcc"
| 70 || July 16 || Cardinals || 3–0 || Parris (3–2) || Osborne || Miceli (13) || 11,113 || 32–38
|- bgcolor="ccffcc"
| 71 || July 18 || @ Braves || 5–4 (10) || Dyer (3–1) || Wohlers || Miceli (14) || 33,940 || 33–38
|- bgcolor="ffbbbb"
| 72 || July 19 || @ Braves || 2–3 || Maddux || Loaiza (6–5) || Wohlers || 35,736 || 33–39
|- bgcolor="ffbbbb"
| 73 || July 20 || @ Braves || 3–4 || Clontz || Plesac (3–1) || — || 31,661 || 33–40
|- bgcolor="ccffcc"
| 74 || July 21 || Expos || 7–6 (12) || Gott (1–2) || Harris || — || 12,500 || 34–40
|- bgcolor="ccffcc"
| 75 || July 22 || Expos || 7–1 || Parris (4–2) || Urbina || — || 27,050 || 35–40
|- bgcolor="ffbbbb"
| 76 || July 23 || Expos || 2–8 || Fassero || Ericks (2–2) || — || 12,012 || 35–41
|- bgcolor="ffbbbb"
| 77 || July 24 || Braves || 2–3 || Clontz || Plesac (3–2) || Wohlers || 16,142 || 35–42
|- bgcolor="ffbbbb"
| 78 || July 25 || Braves || 1–3 (10) || Clontz || Gott (1–3) || Stanton || 13,864 || 35–43
|- bgcolor="ffbbbb"
| 79 || July 26 || @ Phillies || 1–2 (11) || Borland || Plesac (3–3) || — || — || 35–44
|- bgcolor="ffbbbb"
| 80 || July 26 || @ Phillies || 4–6 || Quantrill || Dyer (3–2) || Slocumb || 32,517 || 35–45
|- bgcolor="ffbbbb"
| 81 || July 27 || @ Phillies || 4–6 || Mimbs || Ericks (2–3) || Slocumb || 31,955 || 35–46
|- bgcolor="ccffcc"
| 82 || July 28 || @ Mets || 10–9 || Gott (2–3) || Franco || — || 17,354 || 36–46
|- bgcolor="ffbbbb"
| 83 || July 29 || @ Mets || 1–2 || Franco || Powell (0–1) || — || 17,881 || 36–47
|- bgcolor="ffbbbb"
| 84 || July 30 || @ Mets || 1–2 || Isringhausen || Wagner (1–11) || Franco || 18,258 || 36–48
|- bgcolor="ffbbbb"
| 85 || July 31 || @ Mets || 1–4 || Pulsipher || Parris (4–3) || — || 15,279 || 36–49
|-

|- bgcolor="ffbbbb"
| 86 || August 1 || Cubs || 5–7 || Navarro || Ericks (2–4) || Myers || 19,562 || 36–50
|- bgcolor="ccffcc"
| 87 || August 2 || Cubs || 4–3 (10) || Miceli (2–3) || Young || — || 8,584 || 37–50
|- bgcolor="ffbbbb"
| 88 || August 3 || Cubs || 2–7 || Casian || Gott (2–4) || — || 10,048 || 37–51
|- bgcolor="ffbbbb"
| 89 || August 4 || Astros || 5–6 || Veres || Christiansen (1–1) || Jones || — || 37–52
|- bgcolor="ffbbbb"
| 90 || August 4 || Astros || 4–5 || Brocail || Parris (4–4) || Jones || 12,216 || 37–53
|- bgcolor="ccffcc"
| 91 || August 5 || Astros || 3–1 || Ericks (3–4) || Kile || Miceli (15) || 31,147 || 38–53
|- bgcolor="ccffcc"
| 92 || August 6 || Astros || 6–3 || Loaiza (7–5) || Hampton || Miceli (16) || 16,034 || 39–53
|- bgcolor="ccffcc"
| 93 || August 8 || @ Giants || 9–5 || Neagle (11–4) || Valdez || — || 9,596 || 40–53
|- bgcolor="ffbbbb"
| 94 || August 9 || @ Giants || 3–4 || VanLandingham || Christiansen (1–2) || Beck || 10,949 || 40–54
|- bgcolor="ffbbbb"
| 95 || August 10 || @ Giants || 7–8 || Beck || McCurry (0–3) || — || 11,493 || 40–55
|- bgcolor="ffbbbb"
| 96 || August 11 || @ Dodgers || 2–3 || Valdez || Ericks (3–5) || Worrell || 34,899 || 40–56
|- bgcolor="ffbbbb"
| 97 || August 12 || @ Dodgers || 10–11 (11) || Astacio || McCurry (0–4) || — || 44,032 || 40–57
|- bgcolor="ffbbbb"
| 98 || August 13 || @ Dodgers || 1–4 || Martinez || Neagle (11–5) || Worrell || 38,023 || 40–58
|- bgcolor="ffbbbb"
| 99 || August 14 || @ Padres || 5–6 || Bochtler || Christiansen (1–3) || Hoffman || 9,242 || 40–59
|- bgcolor="ccffcc"
| 100 || August 15 || @ Padres || 6–0 || Parris (5–4) || Blair || — || 10,458 || 41–59
|- bgcolor="ffbbbb"
| 101 || August 16 || @ Padres || 0–2 || Ashby || Ericks (3–6) || Hoffman || 14,046 || 41–60
|- bgcolor="ccffcc"
| 102 || August 18 || Marlins || 13–7 || Wagner (2–11) || Groom || — || — || 42–60
|- bgcolor="ccffcc"
| 103 || August 18 || Marlins || 7–6 (13) || Miceli (3–3) || Groom || — || 13,598 || 43–60
|- bgcolor="ccffcc"
| 104 || August 19 || Marlins || 10–5 || McCurry (1–4) || Veres || — || 13,081 || 44–60
|- bgcolor="ccffcc"
| 105 || August 20 || Marlins || 3–2 || Parris (6–4) || Burkett || Miceli (17) || 13,191 || 45–60
|- bgcolor="ccffcc"
| 106 || August 21 || Marlins || 5–3 || Dyer (4–2) || Gardner || Wagner (1) || 10,202 || 46–60
|- bgcolor="ccffcc"
| 107 || August 22 || @ Rockies || 10–1 || Loaiza (8–5) || Reynoso || — || 48,083 || 47–60
|- bgcolor="ffbbbb"
| 108 || August 23 || @ Rockies || 5–9 || Bailey || Neagle (11–6) || — || 48,027 || 47–61
|- bgcolor="ffbbbb"
| 109 || August 24 || @ Rockies || 6–8 || Painter || Wagner (2–12) || Leskanic || 48,041 || 47–62
|- bgcolor="ffbbbb"
| 110 || August 25 || Reds || 3–19 || Portugal || Parris (6–5) || — || 13,828 || 47–63
|- bgcolor="ffbbbb"
| 111 || August 26 || Reds || 6–7 || Hernandez || Wagner (2–13) || Brantley || 26,090 || 47–64
|- bgcolor="ffbbbb"
| 112 || August 27 || Reds || 1–10 || Schourek || Loaiza (8–6) || — || 18,056 || 47–65
|- bgcolor="ffbbbb"
| 113 || August 28 || Rockies || 3–6 || Bailey || Powell (0–2) || Leskanic || 8,242 || 47–66
|- bgcolor="ccffcc"
| 114 || August 29 || Rockies || 4–0 || Wagner (3–13) || Ritz || — || 7,634 || 48–66
|- bgcolor="ffbbbb"
| 115 || August 30 || Rockies || 0–6 || Rekar || Ericks (3–7) || — || 8,120 || 48–67
|- bgcolor="ccffcc"
| 116 || August 31 || @ Reds || 6–4 (10) || Plesac (4–3) || Brantley || Miceli (18) || 19,509 || 49–67
|-

|- bgcolor="ffbbbb"
| 117 || September 1 || @ Reds || 1–7 || Schourek || Loaiza (8–7) || — || 28,205 || 49–68
|- bgcolor="ccffcc"
| 118 || September 2 || @ Reds || 11–8 || White (1–1) || Wells || — || 35,897 || 50–68
|- bgcolor="ccffcc"
| 119 || September 3 || @ Reds || 7–3 || Wagner (4–13) || Burba || Miceli (19) || 28,516 || 51–68
|- bgcolor="ffbbbb"
| 120 || September 4 || @ Marlins || 3–7 || Burkett || Parris (6–6) || — || 19,427 || 51–69
|- bgcolor="ffbbbb"
| 121 || September 6 || @ Marlins || 1–2 || Banks || Neagle (11–7) || Nen || 17,111 || 51–70
|- bgcolor="ffbbbb"
| 122 || September 8 || Dodgers || 2–8 || Martinez || Loaiza (8–8) || — || 10,050 || 51–71
|- bgcolor="ffbbbb"
| 123 || September 9 || Dodgers || 2–11 || Tapani || Wagner (4–14) || — || 12,773 || 51–72
|- bgcolor="ffbbbb"
| 124 || September 10 || Dodgers || 4–5 || Cummings || Dyer (4–3) || Worrell || 12,154 || 51–73
|- bgcolor="ccffcc"
| 125 || September 11 || Padres || 7–5 || Lieber (3–7) || Ashby || Miceli (20) || 6,356 || 52–73
|- bgcolor="ffbbbb"
| 126 || September 12 || Padres || 1–5 || Valenzuela || Ericks (3–8) || — || 10,269 || 52–74
|- bgcolor="ffbbbb"
| 127 || September 13 || Padres || 7–8 || Villone || Plesac (4–4) || Bochtler || 6,648 || 52–75
|- bgcolor="ffbbbb"
| 128 || September 14 || Phillies || 2–7 || Quantrill || Wagner (4–15) || — || 7,770 || 52–76
|- bgcolor="ffbbbb"
| 129 || September 15 || Giants || 2–4 (10) || Service || Dyer (4–4) || Beck || 10,548 || 52–77
|- bgcolor="ccffcc"
| 130 || September 16 || Giants || 10–2 || Neagle (12–7) || Estes || — || 11,748 || 53–77
|- bgcolor="ccffcc"
| 131 || September 17 || Giants || 5–4 || Lieber (4–7) || Brewington || Plesac (3) || 20,680 || 54–77
|- bgcolor="ffbbbb"
| 132 || September 18 || Cardinals || 2–4 || Osborne || Loaiza (8–9) || Mathews || 8,858 || 54–78
|- bgcolor="ccffcc"
| 133 || September 19 || Cardinals || 12–1 || Wagner (5–15) || Benes || — || 9,196 || 55–78
|- bgcolor="ffbbbb"
| 134 || September 20 || Cardinals || 3–9 || Morgan || White (1–2) || — || 11,190 || 55–79
|- bgcolor="ccffcc"
| 135 || September 21 || @ Cubs || 4–3 || Neagle (13–7) || Trachsel || Miceli (21) || 18,369 || 56–79
|- bgcolor="ffbbbb"
| 136 || September 22 || @ Cubs || 3–6 || Foster || Ericks (3–9) || Myers || 23,652 || 56–80
|- bgcolor="ffbbbb"
| 137 || September 23 || @ Cubs || 5–8 || Bullinger || Dyer (4–5) || Myers || 23,802 || 56–81
|- bgcolor="ffbbbb"
| 138 || September 24 || @ Cubs || 2–3 (10) || Wendell || Miceli (3–4) || — || 20,447 || 56–82
|- bgcolor="ffbbbb"
| 139 || September 25 || @ Astros || 5–10 || Brocail || White (1–3) || — || 11,142 || 56–83
|- bgcolor="ffbbbb"
| 140 || September 26 || @ Astros || 0–2 || Swindell || Neagle (13–8) || Henneman || 14,307 || 56–84
|- bgcolor="ccffcc"
| 141 || September 27 || @ Astros || 6–3 (11) || Miceli (4–4) || Jones || McCurry (1) || 15,005 || 57–84
|- bgcolor="ffbbbb"
| 142 || September 29 || @ Cardinals || 2–3 || Osborne || Morel (0–1) || Henke || 20,842 || 57–85
|- bgcolor="ffbbbb"
| 143 || September 30 || @ Cardinals || 1–5 || Benes || Wagner (5–16) || Henke || 21,004 || 57–86
|-

|- bgcolor="ccffcc"
| 144 || October 1 || @ Cardinals || 10–4 || White (2–3) || Barber || — || 22,175 || 58–86
|-

|-
| Legend:       = Win       = LossBold = Pirates team member

Record vs. opponents

Detailed records

Roster

Opening Day lineup

Player stats
Batting
Note: G = Games played; AB = At bats; H = Hits; Avg. = Batting average; HR = Home runs; RBI = Runs batted in

Pitching
Note: G = Games pitched; IP = Innings pitched; W = Wins; L = Losses; ERA = Earned run average; SO = Strikeouts

Awards and honors

1995 Major League Baseball All-Star Game
Denny Neagle, P, reserve

Transactions
April 22, 1995: Todd Frohwirth was released by the Pittsburgh Pirates.
May 16, 1995: Mackey Sasser was released by the Pittsburgh Pirates.
June 24, 1995: Sam Horn was released by the Pittsburgh Pirates.

Farm system

LEAGUE CHAMPIONS: Carolina

Notes

References
 1995 Pittsburgh Pirates at Baseball Reference
 1995 Pittsburgh Pirates  at Baseball Almanac

Pittsburgh Pirates seasons
Pittsburgh Pirates season
Pitts